Poprad District (okres Poprad) is a district in
the Prešov Region of eastern Slovakia. The district had been established in 1923 and from 1996 exists in its current borders. It consists of 29 municipalities, from which three have a town status. Its seat, cultural and economic center is Poprad, the largest city. Main economic branches are industry and tourism. In Poprad district is located mountain range High Tatras, top tourist attraction in Slovakia.

Municipalities

References

Districts of Slovakia
Geography of Prešov Region